Turks in Uzbekistan are ethnic Turks who live in Uzbekistan.

History

Ottoman migration

The First All-Union Census of the Soviet Union in 1926 recorded that 8,570 Turkish people lived in the Soviet Union. Those of Turkish descent are no longer listed separately in the census, it is presumed that those who were living in Uzbekistan have either been assimilated into Uzbek society or have left the country.

Meskhetian Turks migration

During World War II, the Soviet Union was preparing to launch a pressure campaign against Turkey. Vyacheslav Molotov, who was at the time the Minister of Foreign Affairs, requested to the Turkish Ambassador in Moscow that Turkey surrender of three Anatolian provinces (Kars, Ardahan and Artvin). Thus, war against Turkey seemed possible, and Joseph Stalin wanted to clear the strategic Turkish population situated in Meskheti, near the Turkish-Georgian border, since during the Russo-Turkish Wars the Turks of the region had been loyal to the Ottoman Empire and were therefore likely to be hostile to Soviet intentions. In 1944, the Meskhetian Turks were deported after being accused of smuggling, banditry and espionage in collaboration with their kin across the Turkish border. Nationalistic policies at the time encouraged the slogan: "Georgia for Georgians" and that the Meskhetian Turks should be sent to Turkey "where they belong". They were deported mainly to Uzbekistan, thousands dying en route in cattle-trucks, and were not permitted by the Georgian government of Zviad Gamsakhurdia to return to their homeland.

In the last Soviet Census, which was conducted in 1989, there were 207,500 Meskhetian Turks in the Soviet Union and over 51.2% were registered in Uzbekistan. The majority of the Meskhetian Turks settled in the Ferghana Valley, where many of them became financially better off than the Uzbeks. However, in 1989, their prosperity led to xenophobia directed against them, and ethnic intolerance eventually developed into anti-Meskhetian Turk rioting in the valley. The incidents killed over 100 people, injured over 1,000 and destroyed over 700. In its aftermath, there were indications of plots by nationalist Uzbeks to continue their carnage; the Soviet authorities issued an official ruling that 17,000 Meskhetian Turks, virtually the entire Turkish population in the Fergana Valley, be transported to Russia. Another 70,000 Meskhetian Turks from other parts of Uzbekistan soon followed the first wave of migrants and settled mainly in Azerbaijan and Russia. However, Turks who wish to return to Georgia are required to change their names from Turkish to Georgian, the vast majority of the Meskhetian Turks have rejected these conditions.

Demographics 
Uzbekistan has not conducted a census since 1989, therefore there are no official statistics regarding the current Turkish population in Uzbekistan. International organizations have given rough averages. It is believed that approximately between 15,000 and 20,000 Turks live in Tashkent,  Jizzakh, Sirdaryo Region, Qashqadaryo Region. Furthermore, there are 3,000 Turks in Bukhara, 4,000 in Samarkand and 2,000 in Nawoiy.

Issues in Uzbekistan 
Unlike in neighboring Turkmenistan and Kazakhstan, Turks living in Uzbekistan have faced unfortunate circumstances. Clashes with the Uzbeks in the 1989 riots in Tashkent resulted in over 1,500 casualties. A lack of provisions for the Turkish community continues to prevail, with no Turkish schools or language instruction having been established. Highly Russian and Armenian presentations in this country have also led to erasure of the Turkish peoples. Russians, Armenians, and some Belarusians have openly opposed the idea of an open Turkish community due to historical fear and tension between the Armenians and Turks. Continuing problems have led to a Celine in the Turkish population of Uzbekistan.

Notable people
Isgender Aznaurov, Uzbek-born National Hero of Azerbaijan who fought in the First Nagorno-Karabakh War (Turkish Meskhetian origin)
Bahram Muzaffer, amateur boxer (Turkish Meskhetian origin)
, football coach (Turkish Meskhetian origin)
Timur Kapadze, football player and manager of the Uzbekistan national football team (Turkish Meskhetian origin)
Mikail Suleymanov, Uzbek actor, copywriter and film director (Turkish Meskhetian origin)
, educator (Turkish Meskhetian origin)

See also 
Population transfer in the Soviet Union
Turks in the former Soviet Union
Turkic Council

References

Bibliography 
 
.
.
 

.
.

.
.
.
.
.
 .
.
.
.
.
.
 .

External links 
Soviet Census 1970: Uzbekistan
Soviet Census 1979: Uzbekistan
Soviet Census 1989: Uzbekistan

Uzbekistan
Uzbekistan
Ethnic groups in Uzbekistan